Michael Mandel may refer to:

 Michael Mandel (law professor) (1948–2013), Canadian law professor and author
 Mike Mandel (born 1950), American conceptual artist and photographer
 Michael Mandel (economist), economist and journalist

See also
 J. Michael Mendel (1964–2019), American television producer